Holley-Rankine House is a historic home located at Niagara Falls in Niagara County, New York.  It is a two-and-a-half-story Gothic Revival cottage built about 1855 by prominent local resident George Washington Holley (1810–1897). After his death it became the home of William B. Rankine (1858–1905), who was largely responsible for constructing the Adams Power Plant. It is located overlooking the Niagara River, just above the American Falls.  It is now operated as a bed and breakfast.

It was listed on the National Register of Historic Places in 1979.

References

External links
Holley-Rankine House - U.S. National Register of Historic Places on Waymarking.com

Houses on the National Register of Historic Places in New York (state)
Houses completed in 1855
Gothic Revival architecture in New York (state)
Houses in Niagara County, New York
National Register of Historic Places in Niagara County, New York